Corinne McLaughlin (1947 - 2018) was an American author and educator. She was executive director of The Center for Visionary Leadership and a Fellow of The World Business Academy and the Findhorn Foundation in Scotland. McLaughlin and her partner Gordon Davidson founded Sirius, an ecological village in Massachusetts. She coordinated a national task force for President Clinton's Council on Sustainable Development and has taught politics at American University. McLaughlin has lectured in the U.S., Europe and South America. She is co-author of The Practical Visionary: A New World Guide to Spiritual Growth and Social Change,  Spiritual Politics: Changing the World from the Inside Out and Builders of the Dawn: Community Lifestyles in a Changing World.

She died August 2018 following complications of Parkinsons.

Books
 The Practical Visionary: A New World Guide to Spiritual Growth and Social Change, 2010. With Gordon Davidson, Unity House Publishers. 
 Spiritual Politics: Changing the World from the Inside Out. 1994. With Gordon Davidson.  Ballantine/Random House Books. 
 Builders of the Dawn: Community Lifestyles in a Changing World. 1990. With Gordon Davidson. Book Publishing Company.

References

External links
 Leadership And Power In Intentional Communities by Corinne McLaughlin and Gordon Davidson, In Context #7, Autumn 1984.
 To Think Like Others an Interview with Corinne McLaughlin and Gordon Davidson, by Robert and Diane Gilman.  In Context #29, Summer 1991.

1947 births
Living people
American University faculty and staff
20th-century American women writers
20th-century American non-fiction writers
21st-century American women writers
American women non-fiction writers
21st-century American non-fiction writers
American women academics